UTC+13:00 is an identifier for a time offset from UTC of +13:00. Because it does not contain any land in the Northern Hemisphere, this time zone is exclusive to the Southern Hemisphere.

As standard time (year-round)
Principal cities: Apia, Atafu, Nukuʻalofa

Oceania

Micronesia 
Kiribati
 Phoenix Islands

Polynesia 
New Zealand
Tokelau – Time in Tokelau
Samoa – Time in Samoa
Tonga

As daylight saving time (Southern Hemisphere summer)
Principal cities: Wellington, Auckland, Suva

Oceania

Melanesia 
Fiji

Australasia 
New Zealand (except Chatham Islands) – New Zealand Daylight Time

Antarctica
Some research bases in Antarctica, in particular the South Pole and the McMurdo Station. At New Year, these places are the first in the world to see the Sun, which is then visible at midnight.

History
Kiribati introduced a change for its eastern half on 31 December 1994, from time zones UTC−11:00 and UTC−10:00 to UTC+13:00 and UTC+14:00, to avoid having the country divided by the International Date Line.

Tonga has been on UTC+13:00 for many years. Daylight saving time was used in the southern summer seasons from October 1999 to January 2002, and from November 2016 to January 2017 (written 2017).

UTC+13:00 was used till 2009 as a daylight time (summer in Northern Hemisphere) in the most eastern parts of Russia (Chukotka and Kamchatka) that used Kamchatka Time.

Following Samoa's decision, Tokelau also simultaneously advanced its standard time (used without daylight saving time), from UTC−11:00 to UTC+13:00.

See also
Time in New Zealand
Time in Russia
Time in Samoa
UTC−11:00, which is exactly one day behind UTC+13:00.
UTC−12:00, the last time zone to start a new day

References

UTC offsets